Upplands Väsby Municipality (Upplands Väsby kommun) is a municipality in Stockholm County in east central Sweden, with a population of 38,963 (2010). Its seat is located in the town of Upplands Väsby.

The municipality was created in connection with the municipal reform of 1952, when the rural municipalities Ed, Fresta and Hammarby were amalgamated. It got its name from a settlement which had evolved around the railway station.

The name Väsby can be attested (as Vesby) from the 13th century. The prefix "Upplands" came to be used by the post station in 1919 as a means of separating it from other Väsbys in the country. The municipality was then named "Upplands-Väsby" for a time, but the dash was removed on 19 September 2002.

Geography
Upplands Väsby is located in between Stockholm and Arlanda Airport, and the East Coast Line railroad goes through the municipality. There are local train services to Arlanda Airport, Uppsala, Stockholm Central Station and Älvsjö (Stockholm commuter rail).

The land is covered with good soil, forests, and moraine. The western part border to a creek of the lake Mälaren (not visible on the map), which also marks the border to the municipality Upplands-Bro. There are also other water areas, such as streams and small lakes, in the municipality. One of them is the small river Väsbyån, flowing through Väsby, in which the uncommon fish asp swims.

History
Located in the province of Uppland the municipality holds remains from the Stone Age. Runestones and axes from the Bronze Age have also been found. The number of rune inscriptions in the municipality amounts to 76.

When Väsby Centrum, a shopping centre that currently houses some 60 stores, was built in Väsby in 1972 the population grew markedly. The mall is currently undergoing a large increase; 20 new stores will have opened by spring 2007, bringing the mall's total up to 80 stores.

Demography

Population development

Residents with a foreign background
On the 31st of December 2017 the number of people with a foreign background (persons born outside of Sweden or with two parents born outside of Sweden) was 17 533, or 39.31% of the population (44 605 on the 31st of December 2017). On the 31st of December 2002 the number of residents with a foreign background was (per the same definition) 10 132, or 27.06% of the population (37 444 on the 31st of December 2002). On 31 December 2017 there were 44 605 residents in Upplands Väsby, of which 13 009 people (29.16%) were born in a country other than Sweden. Divided by country in the table below - the Nordic countries as well as the 12 most common countries of birth outside of Sweden for Swedish residents have been included, with other countries of birth bundled together by continent by Statistics Sweden.

References

External links

Upplands Väsby Municipality - Official site
Väsby Centrum  (in Swedish)

Municipalities of Stockholm County
Metropolitan Stockholm